The Man Who Talked Too Much is a 1940 American drama film directed by Vincent Sherman and written by Walter DeLeon and Earl Baldwin. Starring George Brent, Virginia Bruce, Brenda Marshall, Richard Barthelmess, William Lundigan, George Tobias and John Litel, the film was released by Warner Bros. on July 16, 1940.

The Man Who Talked Too Much is the second of three films adapted from the 1929 play The Mouthpiece by Frank J. Collins, in which a former prosecutor, disillusioned by sending an innocent man to the electric chair, takes the saying "Better that a hundred guilty men go free than one innocent man suffer the death penalty" one step further by becoming a defense attorney for gangsters and adroitly tightrope walking legal ethics. Collins based his protagonist on Manhattan defense attorney William Joseph Fallon, dubbed "The Great Mouthpiece" in the New York press, who had a short but spectacularly successful career before succumbing to the effects of his own dissoluteness at the age of 41.

Plot
Steve Forbes prosecutes a case so convincingly, an innocent man ends up sentenced to die in the electric chair. He quits the district attorney's office and opens a private practice, resulting in racketeer J.B. Roscoe becoming a client.

The money he makes allows Steve to put younger brother Johnny through law school. After a while, Joan Reed, his secretary, and Johnny both become appalled by how unethical Steve has become in his profession. Johnny informs on Roscoe, after which the gangster frames him for a murder. Unable to save him in court, Steve works desperately to prove Johnny's innocence before his brother's execution.

Cast 
 George Brent as Stephen M. Forbes
 Virginia Bruce as Joan Reed
 Brenda Marshall as Celia Farrady
 Richard Barthelmess as J.B. Roscoe
 William Lundigan as John L. Forbes
 George Tobias as Slug 'Canvasback' McNutt
 John Litel as District Attorney Dickson
 Henry Armetta as Tony Spirella
 Alan Baxter as Joe Garland
 David Bruce as Gerald Wilson
 Clarence Kolb as E.A. Smith
 Louis Jean Heydt as Barton
 Marc Lawrence as Lefty Kyler
 Edwin Stanley as District Attorney Nelson 
 Kay Sutton as Mrs. Knight
 Elliott Sullivan as Bill
 Dick Rich as Pete
 Phyllis Hamilton as Myrtle
 John Ridgely as Brooks
 William Forrest as Federal District Attorney Green
 Maris Wrixon as Roscoe's Secretary
 Margaret Hayes as Governor's Secretary

Reception
Bosley Crowther of The New York Times said, "Garrulity is a social evil which very few people can abide, and the truth of the matter is that The Man Who Talked Too Much talks too much, too. For a straight gangster picture, which should be fast and concise, it is ponderously slow and windy and as transparent as a goldfish bowl. There are two identically suspenseful sequences, at the beginning and at the end, when innocent men linger painfully in the shadow of the electric chair while people rush around madly to save them. And that's about all the suspense there is."

References

External links 
 
 
 
 

1940 films
Warner Bros. films
American drama films
1940 drama films
Films directed by Vincent Sherman
Films scored by Heinz Roemheld
American black-and-white films
American films based on plays
1940s English-language films
1940s American films